Winston Surfshirt is an Australian funk, hip hop band formed in 2015 by lead vocals and multi-instrumentalist Winston, Bustlip on beats, The Bone on trombone, Bik Julio on bass guitar, Dool on keyboards and Mi-K on guitar.

History 

The group started when solo musician, Winston Surfshirt, formed the eponymous six-piece funk, hip hop band in 2015 with Surfshirt on lead vocals and multi-instrumentals, Bustlip on beats, The Bone  on trombone, Bik Julio on bass guitar, Dool on keyboards and Mi-K on guitar and keys. Their stylistic influences include both surf rock and West Coast hip hop. Winston Surfshirt have performed at Falls Festival and Splendour in the Grass, and have supported Rüfüs on tour. They released their first album, Sponge Cake, on 29 September 2017, and released their second, Apple Crumble, on 15 November 2019.

In August 2022, the group announced the forthcoming release of their third studio album, Panna Cotta, scheduled for release in November 2022.

Discography

Studio albums

Remix albums

Extended Plays

Singles

As lead artist

As featured artist

Notes

Awards and nominations

AIR Awards
The Australian Independent Record Awards (commonly known informally as AIR Awards) is an annual awards night to recognise, promote and celebrate the success of Australia's Independent Music sector.

|-
| AIR Awards of 2018
| Sponge Cake
| Best Independent Hip Hop/Urban Album
| 
|-

APRA Awards
The APRA Awards are several award ceremonies run in Australia by the Australasian Performing Right Association (APRA) to recognise composing and song writing skills, sales and airplay performance by its members annually. 

|-
| 2021 || "NobodyLikeYou" || Most Performed R&B / Soul Work || 
|-

References

Musical groups established in 2015
Australian funk musical groups
Australian hip hop groups
2015 establishments in Australia